The 2006 AFC Futsal Championship was held in Tashkent, Uzbekistan from 21 May to 27 May 2006.

Qualification

Venue

Draw 
The draw for the 2006 AFC Futsal Championship was held on 27 April 2006 in Tashkent, Uzbekistan.

Group stage

Group A

Group B

Group C

Group D

Knockout stage

Semi-finals

Third place play-off

Final

Awards 

 Most Valuable Player
 Kenichiro Kogure
 Top Scorer
 Vahid Shamsaei (16 goals)
 Fair-Play Award

References

 RSSSF
 AFC

AFC Futsal Championship
F
Championship
International futsal competitions hosted by Uzbekistan
21st century in Tashkent
Sport in Tashkent